10.000 luchtballonnen is the fourteenth studio album by Belgian-Dutch girl group K3. It is the first album that was recorded by the new formation of K3, which was formed in the 2015 television show K3 zoekt K3. The album was released on 18 December 2015 by Studio 100. The album features twelve completely new songs, as well as twelve consisting K3-songs re-recorded by the new members. The album became a big success, especially in Belgium where it debuted at number one on the Belgian Album Top 200 and was certified 8× Platinum by the Belgian Entertainment Association, but also in The Netherlands where it reached the second position on the Dutch Album Top 100 and was certified Platinum by the NVPI. The first single, also called "10.000 luchtballonnen", was released after the finale of the television show, and debuted at number one at the Ultratop 50.

Track listing

Charts and certifications

Weekly charts

Year-end charts

Certifications

References

2015 albums
K3 (band) albums